The Corneille River (River of the crow) is a river in the Côte-Nord region of Quebec, Canada. It empties into the Gulf of Saint Lawrence opposite Anticosti Island.

Location

It lies between the basins of the Ours River to the west and the Piashti River to the east.
The river basin covers part of the unorganized territory of Lac-Jérôme, and parts of the municipalities of Baie-Johan-Beetz and Havre-Saint-Pierre.
The mouth of the river is in the municipality of Baie-Johan-Beetz in the Minganie Regional County Municipality.
The origin of the name is unknown.

A map of the ecological regions of Quebec shows the river in sub-regions 6j-T and 6m-T of the east spruce/moss subdomain.

Description

According to the Dictionnaire des rivières et lacs de la province de Québec (1914),

Fishing

They provide accommodation, and easy access to productive Atlantic salmon pools.
There is also plentiful brook trout.
The outfitter is based on a granite island at the confluence of the Corneille River and the Gulf of St. Lawrence.
The island is in the  Mingan Archipelago National Park Reserve.

In 2014 a program funded by Hydro-Québec as part of the development of the Romaine River hydroelectric project built a path by which the salmon could pass this obstacle.
Controlled blasting in the bedrock created an excavated channel near the left bank that carried about 10% of the river's flow to create a salmon run.
This gave the fish access to an additional  of the river, and reduced the time they spent at the foot of the falls, where they were at risk of poaching.

Follow-up activities include inventories using electrical fishing, a scientific research project to measure the interaction between the salmon and other fish species in the upstream section, including landlocked salmon, and a camera system to monitor several sites where intruders could access the river for illegal fishing.

In May 2015 the Ministry of Forests, Wildlife and Parks of Quebec announced a sport fishing catch-and-release program for large salmon on sixteen of Quebec's 118 salmon rivers.
These were the Mitis, Laval, Pigou, Bouleau, Aux Rochers, Jupitagon, Magpie, Saint-Jean, Corneille, Piashti, Watshishou, Little Watshishou, Nabisipi, Aguanish and Natashquan rivers.
The Quebec Atlantic Salmon Federation said that the measures did not go nearly far enough in protecting salmon for future generations.
In view of the rapidly declining Atlantic salmon population catch-and-release should have been implemented on all rivers apart from northern Quebec.

Notes

Sources

Rivers of Côte-Nord